The following is a list of well-known beach volleyball players in the United States:
 Dain Blanton
 Nicole Branagh
 Phil Dalhausser
 Emily Day
 Mike Dodd
 Eric Fonoimoana
 Lauren Fendrick
 Jennifer Fopma
 Brent Frohoff
 Matt Fuerbringer
 Jake Gibb
 Sara Hughes
 Casey Jennings
 Jenny Johnson Jordan
 Karch Kiraly
 Karolyn Kirby
 Alix Klineman
 Mike Lambert
 Misty May-Treanor
 Holly McPeak
 Stein Metzger
 Jeff Nygaard
 Casey Patterson
 Gabrielle Reece
 Todd Rogers
 Sean Rosenthal
 Jennifer Kessy
 April Ross
 Summer Ross
 Eugene Selznick
 Sinjin Smith
 Randy Stoklos
 Brooke Sweat
 Rachel Wacholder
 Kerri Walsh Jennings
 Aaron Wexler
 Mike Whitmarsh
 Kevin Wong
 Elaine Youngs

References

Beach volleyball players
Lists of American sportspeople
American